Narayana Guru, (20 August 1856 – 20 September 1928) was a philosopher, spiritual leader and social reformer in India. He led a reform movement against the injustice in the caste-ridden society of Kerala in order to promote spiritual enlightenment and social equality.

Biography

Narayanan, né Nanu, was born on 20 August 1856 to Madan Asan and Kuttiyamma in an Ezhava family of ayurvedic physicians, in the village of Chempazhanthy near Thiruvananthapuram, in the erstwhile state of Travancore. Unlike other Ezhavas who confined their Sanskrit reading to ayurvedic works, Narayanaguru studied religious texts as well. His early education was in the gurukula way under Chempazhanthi Mootha Pillai during which time his mother died when he was 15. At the age of 21, he went to central Travancore to learn from Raman Pillai Asan, a Sanskrit scholar who taught him Vedas, Upanishads and the literature and logical rhetoric of Sanskrit. He returned to his village in 1881, when his father was seriously ill, and started a village school where he taught local children which earned him the name Nanu Asan. A year later, he married Kaliamma but soon disassociated himself from the marriage to commence his public life as a social reformer.

Leaving home, he traveled through Kerala and Tamil Nadu and it was during these journeys, he met Chattampi Swamikal, a social and religious reformer, who introduced Guru to Ayyavu Swamikal from whom he learned meditation and yoga. Later, he continued his wanderings until he reached the Pillathadam cave at Maruthwamala where he set up an hermitage and practiced meditation and yoga for the next eight years. In 1888, he visited Aruvippuram where he meditated for a while and during his stay there, he consecrated a piece of rock taken from the river, as the idol of Shiva, which has since become the Aruvippuram Shiva Temple. The act, which later came to be known as Aruvipuram Pratishta, created a social commotion among the upper caste Brahmins who questioned Guru's right to consecrate the idol. His reply to them that "This is not a Brahmin Shiva but an Ezhava Shiva" later became a famous quote, used against casteism. It was here, the Sree Narayana Dharma Paripalana Yogam (SNDP Yogam) was founded on 15 May 1903 by the efforts of Padmanabhan Palpu, better known as Dr. Palpu, with Narayana Guru as its founder president.

Guru shifted his base to Sivagiri, near Varkala in 1904 where he opened a school for children from the lower strata of the society and provided free education to them without considering their caste. However, it took him seven years to build a temple there, the Sarada Mutt was built in 1912. He also built temples in other places such as Thrissur, Kannur, Anchuthengu, Thalassery, Kozhikode, and Mangalore and it took him to many places including Sri Lanka (then called Ceylon) where he made his final visit in 1926. On his return to India, he was involved in a number of activities including the planning of the Sivagiri pilgrimage which was planned after his visit to Pallathuruthy in 1927 to attend the anniversary of the S.N.D.P. Yogam.

Soon after the meeting at Pallathuruthy, which was the last public function he attended, Guru became ill and underwent treatment at places such as Aluva, Thrissur, Palakkad, and finally to Chennai; the physicians attended to him included Ayurvedic physicians like Cholayil Mami Vaidyar, Panappally Krishnan Vaidyar and Thycauttu Divakaran Moos as well as allopathic physicians viz. . Krishnan Thampi, Panikker, Palpu and a European physician by name, Noble. He returned to Sarada Mutt and died on 20 September 1928, at the age of 72.

Legacy

Fight against casteism 
Casteism was practised in Kerala during the 19th and early 20th centuries and the lower caste people such as Ezhavas and the untouchable castes like Paraiyars, tribals and Pulayars had to suffer discrimination from the upper caste community It was against this discrimination that Guru performed his first major public act, the consecration of Siva idol at Aruvippuram in 1888. Overall, he consecrated forty five temples across Kerala and Tamil Nadu..His consecrations were not necessarily conventional deities; a slab inscribed with the words, 
Truth, Ethics, Compassion, Love, a vegetarian Shiva, a mirror and a sculpture by an Italian sculptor were among the various consecrations made by him. He propagated the ideals of compassion and religious tolerance and one of his noted works, Anukampadasakam, extols various religious figures such as Krishna, The Buddha, Adi Shankara, Jesus Christ.

Vaikom Satyagraha 
The social protest of Vaikom Satyagraha was an agitation by the lower caste against untouchability in Hindu society of Travancore. It was reported that the trigger for the protest was an incident when Narayana Guru was stopped from passing through a road leading to Vaikom Temple by an upper caste person. It prompted Kumaran Asan and Muloor S.Padmanabha Panicker, both disciples of Guru, to compose poems in protest of the incident. T. K. Madhavan, another disciple, petitioned the Sree Moolam Popular Assembly in 1918 for rights to enter the temple and worship, regardless of the caste. A host of people including K. Kelappan and K. P. Kesava Menon, formed a committee and announced Kerala Paryatanam movement and with the support of Mahatma Gandhi, the agitation developed into a mass movement which resulted in the opening of the temple as well as three roads leading to it to people of all castes. The protest also influenced the Temple Entry Proclamation of 1936.

Sivagiri pilgrimage
Sivagiri pilgrimage was conceived by three of the disciples of Guru viz. Vallabhasseri Govindan Vaidyar, T. K. Kittan Writer and Muloor S. Padmanabha Panicker which Guru approved in 1928, with his own recommendations. He suggested that the goals of the pilgrimage should be the promotion of education, cleanliness, devotion to God, organization, agriculture, trade, handicrafts, and technical training and advised Vaidyar and Writer to organise a series of lectures on these themes to stress the need for the practice of these ideals, stating this to be the core purpose of Sivagiri pilgrimage. However, his death soon after delayed the project until 1932 when the first pilgrimage was undertaken from Elavumthitta in Pathanamthitta District.

Writings and philosophy 

Guru published 45 works in Malayalam, Sanskrit and Tamil languages which include Atmopadesa Śatakam, a hundred-verse spiritual poem and Daiva Dasakam, a universal prayer in ten verses. He also translated three major texts, Thirukural of Valluvar, Ishavasya Upanishad and Ozhivil Odukkam of Kannudaiya Vallalaar. It was he who propagated the motto, One Caste, One Religion, One God for All (Oru Jathi, Oru Matham, Oru Daivam, Manushyanu) which has become popular as a saying in Kerala. He furthered the non-dualistic philosophy of Adi Sankara by bringing it into practice by adding the concepts of social equality and universal brotherhood.

Ashtalakshyangal
Vidyabhyasam
Shuchitwam
Eeshwaravishwasam
Krishi
Kaithozhil
Kachawadam
Sanghadana
Shastra sanketika Parisheelanam

All Religions' Conference 
Guru organized an All Religion Conference in 1923 at Alwaye Advaita Ashram, which was reported to be first such event in India. It was an effort to counter the religious conversions Ezhava community was susceptible to and at the entrance of the conference, he arranged for a message to be displayed which read, We meet here not to argue and win, but to know and be known. The conference has since become an annual event, organised every year at the Ashram.

Notable disciples 

 Bodhananda Swamikal
 Nataraja Guru
 Kumaran Asan
 Sahodaran Ayyappan
 T. K. Madhavan
 C. V. Kunhiraman
 Padmanabhan Palpu
 Muloor S. Padmanabha Panicker
 Velutheri Kesavan Vaidyar

Public acceptance, honours and veneration

In 1916, Ramana Maharshi hosted Narayana Guru at his Tiruvannamalai ashram when Guru was returning from a trip to Kancheepuram where Swami Govindananda, a disciple of Guru, had established the Sree Narayana Seva Ashram. Rabindranath Tagore met Narayana Guru at the latter's ashram in Sivagiri in November 1922. Tagore later said of Narayana Guru that, "I have never come across one who is spiritually greater than Swami Narayana Guru or a person who is at par with him in spiritual attainment". Three years later, Mahatma Gandhi visited Guru during his 1925 trip to Kerala to participate in the Vaikom Satyagraha after which the Indian independence movement leader stated that "it was a great privilege in his life to have the darshan of an esteemed sage like Sree Narayana Guru."

On 21 August 1967, Narayana Guru was commemorated on an Indian postage stamp of denomination 15 nP. Another commemorative stamp on him was issued by Sri Lanka Post on 4 September 2009. The Reserve Bank of India issued two sets of commemorative coins depicting Guru's image, each valued at 5 and 100 respectively, on the occasion of his 150th birth anniversary.

The first of the several statues of Narayana Guru was erected at Jagannath Temple, Thalassery in 1927 while he was still alive. His statues are seen in many places in Kerala which include a 24 feet statue at Kaithamukku in Thiruvananthapuram. The Government of Kerala observe the birthday, the Sri Narayana Jayanthi, and the date of death (Sree Narayana Guru Samadhi) of Narayana Guru as public holidays.

In popular media 
The life of Narayana Guru has been portrayed in a number of movies starting with the 1986 film Sree Narayana Guru, made by award-winning director P. A. Backer. Swamy Sreenarayana Guru, an Indian Malayalam-language film directed by Krishnaswamy, released the same year. Almost a decade and a half later, R. Sukumaran made a film on the life of Guru, titled Yugapurushan in 2010 with Thalaivasal Vijay playing the role of Guru and the film also featured Mammootty and Navya Nair. Brahmashri Narayana Guru Swamy is a Tulu film made in 2014 by Rajashekar Kotian on Guru's life and the film was the 50th film made in the language. His life during the eight years he spent at Maruthwamala (also known as Marunnumamala) has been adapted into a docufiction, titled Marunnumamala and the film was released by Pinarayi Vijayan, the chief minister of Kerala on 9 August 2016.

Works

In Malayalam

 Swanubavageethi
 Aathmopadesh Shathakam
 Adwaitha deepika
 Arivu
 
 
 Jeevakarunya Panchakam
 Anukamba Dasakam
 Jathi Nirnayam
 Jathi Lakshanam
 Chijjada Chinthanam
 Daiva vichinthanam – 1 & 2
 Athma Vilasam
 
 Kolatheereshastavam
 Bhadrakaalyashtakam
 Gajendra moksham vanchipattu
 Ottapadyangal 
 Sree Krishnana Darsanam
 Mangalasamsakal 
 
 Subramanya Ashtakam
 Sadasiva Darsanam
 Samasya 
 Swanubhava Geethi
 Indrya Vairagyam

In Sanskrit

 
 
 
 Nirvruthi Panchakam
 Slokathrayi
 Vedantha Suthram
 Homa Manthram
 Municharya Panchakam
 Asramam
 Dharmam
 Charama Slokangal
 Homa Mantram
 Chidambarashtakam
 Guhashtakam
 Bhadrakaliashtakam
 Vinayaka Ashtakam
 Sree Vasudeva Ashtakam
 Janani Navaratna Manjari

In Tamil
 Thevarappathinkangal

Translations

 Thirukural
 Isavasyo Upanishad
 Ozhivil Odukkam

Translations of Guru's works into other languages

See also

 Ayyathan Gopalan
 Kallingal Madathil Rarichan Moopan
 Brahmananda Swami Sivayogi
 Mithavaadi Krishnan
 Sree Narayana Trust
 Temples consecrated by Narayana Guru
 Vagbhatananda

Notes

References

Further reading

 (Re)construction of ‘the Social’ for Making a Modern Kerala: Reflections on Narayana Guru's Social Philosophy, Satheese Chandra Bose, published in Satheese Chandra Bose and Shiju Sam Varughese (eds.) 2015. Kerala Modernity: Ideas, Spaces and Practices in Transition. Hyderabad: Orient Blackswan.
 Sree Narayana Guruswamikalude jeeva charithram– Moorkoth Kumaran-(The official biography as approved by Sivagiri mutt.) Published by SNDS Trust
 Sree Narayana Gurudeva Krithikal – Sampoorna Vyakyanam – G Balakrishnan Nair- (Works of Sree Narayana Guru with Complete Interpretations – ten parts compiled in two volumes) published by The State Institute of Languages, Kerala.
 Brahmarshi Sree Narayana Guru – Dr. T. Bhaskaran- published by Sahitya Akademi.
 The Word of the Guru : The Life and Teaching of Guru Narayana : Nataraja Guru, D.K. Printworld, 2003, New Delhi, 
 Srinarayana Guruvinte Sampoorna Kruthikal (Complete Works of Sri Narayana Guru): Mathrubhoomi Publishers, Kozhikode, Kerala
 Sri Narayana Guruvinte Mathavum Sivagiriyum (Sivagiri and the Religion of Sri Narayana Guru): K. Maheshwaran Nair
 Narayanaguru- Editor: P.K.Balakrishnan (A collection of essays in Malayalam):March 2000, (First Edition 1954), Kerala Sahitya Academi, Trichur, Kerala.
 The Philosophy of Narayana Guru: Swami Muni Narayana Prasad, D.K. Printworld, 2003, New Delhi, .
 Sree Narayana Gurudev - the Maharshi who made Advaita a Science - [Prof:G.K.Sasidharan]: Many Worlds Publications, Kollam, Kerala (First Edition 2014)

External links

 
 
 

 
1856 births
1928 deaths
20th-century Indian philosophers
Indian reformers
Advaitin philosophers
Indian Hindu spiritual teachers
20th-century Hindu philosophers and theologians
Prophets
Scholars from Thiruvananthapuram
Indian social reformers
19th-century Hindu religious leaders
20th-century Hindu religious leaders
20th-century Indian writers
19th-century Indian philosophers
19th-century Indian writers
Writers from Thiruvananthapuram
Indian male writers
People of the Kingdom of Travancore
Activists from Kerala
Shudra Hindu saints
Malayali Hindu saints
Anti-caste activists